Meisenheimer is a surname. Notable people with the surname include:

 Jakob Meisenheimer (1876–1934), German chemist
 Johannes Meisenheimer (1873–1933), German zoologist
 John L. Meisenheimer (born 1933), American chemist
 Lucky Meisenheimer (born 1957), American actor